Philip Robinson (21 November 1942 – 1989) was an English professional footballer who played as a winger. Active in the Football League between 1960 and 1970, Robinson made 300 career appearances, scoring 31 goals.

Career
Born in Doncaster, Robinson began his career in non-League football with Montrose Victoria, before turning professional with Huddersfield Town in 1960. He later played for Doncaster Rovers, Bradford Park Avenue and Darlington, before returning to non-League football with Boston United in 1970.

Later life and death
Robinson died in 1989.

References

1942 births
1989 deaths
English footballers
Huddersfield Town A.F.C. players
Doncaster Rovers F.C. players
Bradford (Park Avenue) A.F.C. players
Darlington F.C. players
Boston United F.C. players
English Football League players
Association football wingers